Doto fragilis is a species of sea slug, a nudibranch, a marine gastropod mollusc in the family Dotidae.

Subspecies
 Doto fragilis nipponensis Baba, 1971
 Doto fragilis umia Ev. Marcus & Er. Marcus, 1969: synonym of Doto chica Ev. Marcus & Er. Marcus, 1960

Distribution
This species was first described from the Isle of Man in the Irish Sea in 1838 by the famed naturalist Edward Forbes. It has subsequently been reported from all around Britain and Ireland and continental coasts south to Portugal and into the Mediterranean Sea.

Description
The body of this nudibranch is predominantly brown in colour. There is a series of pale patches along the sides of the body.

EcologyDoto fragilis feeds on the hydroids Nemertesia antennina and Nemertesia ramosa, family Plumulariidae.

References

 Gofas, S.; Le Renard, J.; Bouchet, P. (2001). Mollusca. in: Costello, M.J. et al. (Ed.) (2001). European register of marine species: a check-list of the marine species in Europe and a bibliography of guides to their identification''. Collection Patrimoines Naturels. 50: pp. 180–213

External links
 
 

Dotidae
Gastropods described in 1838
Taxa named by Edward Forbes